Vivir un poco (English title: Live a little) is a Mexican telenovela, which was produced and broadcast by Televisa in 1985. The story was a remake of the very popular Chilean telenovela, La Madrastra from 1981. Vivir un poco tells the story of the quest of Andrea to find justice and her long-lost children but must face the lies and intrigue of the past and present. A story of questions, why? who? how? and the mystery of finding a real killer and discovering family secrets.

When this telenovela aired, during commercial breaks, Televisa showed a 10-second mini commercial where all the suspects to the murder including Andrea were shown one by one and a voice said "Quien es el verdadero asesino, quien?" or " Who is the real killer, who?". It starred by Angélica Aragón, Rogelio Guerra, Beatriz Sheridan, Patricia Pereyra and Arturo Peniche.

Plot
In 1965, Andrea travels to Buenos Aires, Argentina with her husband, Gregorio, his 2 sisters and a group of family friends. During the trip, one in their group, Martha, is murdered in her hotel room, and Andrea is discovered at the crime scene holding the gun with which Martha was killed. As all evidence initially points to Andrea as the killer, she is tried and sentenced to prison for Martha's murder.

Her husband and friends believe she is guilty and abandon her in Argentina, returning to Mexico City vowing never to mention Andrea's name again. Gregorio decides to lie to his children when they grow up. He makes them adore the portrait of a woman that doesn't exist and makes them believe that woman is their dead mother. He does this in order to erase Andrea from all of their lives as he is convinced she will never return - finishing her days in that prison where he abandoned her.

Cast

Awards

References

External links

1985 telenovelas
Mexican telenovelas
Televisa telenovelas
1985 Mexican television series debuts
1985 Mexican television series endings
Television shows set in Mexico City
Television shows set in Buenos Aires
Mexican television series based on Chilean television series
Spanish-language telenovelas